Kartidris is an Indomalayan genus of terrestrial ants in the subfamily Myrmicinae. Its six species are known from mountainous areas in China, Thailand and India.

Species
Kartidris ashima Xu & Zheng, 1995
Kartidris fujianensis Wang, 1993
Kartidris galos Bolton, 1991
Kartidris matertera Bolton, 1991
Kartidris nyos Bolton, 1991
Kartidris sparsipila Xu, 1999

References

External links

Myrmicinae
Ant genera
Hymenoptera of Asia